Breakfast Time was British television's first national breakfast television programme, broadcast from 17 January 1983 until 29 September 1989 on BBC1 across the United Kingdom. It was broadcast for the first time just over two weeks before TV-am, the commercial breakfast television station.

On 2 October 1989, the show became Breakfast News.

Format
Breakfast Time mixed hard news with accessible features, creating a cosy feel, with sofas and bright colours. The presenters typically wore casual clothes instead of formal suits, in contrast to the regular news broadcasts. Frank Bough, Selina Scott and Nick Ross anchored the show, with regulars such as Russell Grant (astrology) and Diana Moran, also known as the "Green Goddess" due to the colour of her leotard.

The news was read by Debbie Rix, while each region opted out of the main programme at quarter past and quarter to the hour to broadcast short regional news bulletins. Initially, viewers in London and the South East were provided with their regional news by one of the main Breakfast Time presenters rather than a regional presentation team. This continued until autumn 1985 when the new London and South East regional news programme London Plus started to provide the regional news opt-outs during the programme.

The weather slot (known as Window on the Weather) was presented by Francis Wilson, and reflected the rest of the show in having a more laid-back feel. Window on the Weather actually introduced modern, projection-style graphics some two years ahead of the transition from the old-style magnetic boards used in the BBC's main weather bulletins. Whilst Wilson was the resident weather presenter on the show, other presenters such as Michael Fish, Bill Giles and Ian McCaskill stood in during Wilson's absence.

During Breakfast Time'''s first broadcast, letters and telegrams were sent from different breakfast shows around the world to wish Breakfast Time good luck such as Network Ten for Australia, CTV for Canada, CBS and ABC for the United States, TVB for Hong Kong and NHK for Japan. Among the in-studio guests on the first Breakfast Time on 17 January 1983 was Jane Pauley, presenter of NBC News Today in the United States.Breakfast Time aired from 6:30 am until 9:00 am each weekday morning. On Monday 18 February 1985, the programme changed to a later time slot of 6:50 am until 9:20 am.

On Monday 10 November 1986, Breakfast Time was relaunched with a news desk and presenters in suits. Hardened journalists such as Jeremy Paxman and Kirsty Wark joined the team as the programme shifted its tone to analysis of the morning's news stories, especially politics. The new look programme also started later, running from 7:00 am and ended any time between 8:30am and 8:55am.

Comparisons with TV-am
The commercial breakfast show TV-am launched two weeks later on ITV. Despite TV-am's high-profile presenters, Breakfast Time proved more popular with viewers.

The programme notably broadcast continuous live coverage of the Brighton hotel bombing at the Conservative Party conference in 1984. TV-am, meanwhile, were castigated by the broadcasting authority for their poor coverage of the event. TV-am had just one crew covering the conference, but they had been called back to London to cover a train crash in Wembley. Only John Stapleton was present in Brighton, and had to make do with phoning in reports from a public phone box, with a picture of him shown on screen, along with an archive picture of the hotel.

Unlike TV-am, Breakfast Time was only broadcast on weekdays – weekend breakfast transmissions on BBC1 continued to consist of programmes from The Open University. However, on two occasions, weekend editions of the programme were broadcast. They were to provide coverage of the Zeebrugge ferry disaster and the Hillsborough football disaster.

Olympic Breakfast Time

The 1984 and 1988 Summer Olympic Games took place during the period when Breakfast Time was on air and during both Games, with the exception of news, weather and regional news, the programme was entirely devoted to Olympic coverage. In 1984, the time difference meant that Olympic Breakfast Time was given over to highlights of the overnight action. Frank Bough presented the programme with David Icke providing "Olympic Action Summaries" at 7.05, 8.05 and 8.50. In 1988, Olympic Breakfast Time coincided with the middle of the afternoon local time so the programme mixed live coverage with overnight highlights. Steve Rider was the presenter with David Icke providing Olympic summaries at 6.30, 7.30 and 8.30am. During both Games, Olympic Breakfast Time was also broadcast over the weekend, although the Sunday edition in 1984 started at the later time of 7am. The weekend editions also included news summaries, albeit hourly rather than every 30 minutes.BBC Genome Project – BBC1 listings 1 October 1988

Further reading
 Ian Jones, Morning Glory: A history of British breakfast television''. Kelly, 2004.

References

External links

Breakfast Time at TV Ark

BBC television news shows
1983 British television series debuts
1989 British television series endings
English-language television shows
Breakfast television in the United Kingdom